A chemise or shift is a classic smock, or a modern type of women's undergarment or dress. Historically, a chemise was a simple garment worn next to the skin to protect clothing from sweat and body oils, the precursor to the modern shirts commonly worn in Western nations.

Etymology
The English word chemise is a loanword from the French word for shirt and is related to the Italian  or Latin , which, according to Elizabeth Wayland Barber, is likely derived from Celtic.

History

The chemise seems to have developed from the Roman tunica and first became popular in Europe in the Middle Ages. Women wore a shift or chemise under their gown or robe; while men wore a chemise with their trousers or braies, and covered the chemises with garments such as doublets, robes, etc. 

Until the late 18th century, a chemise referred to an undergarment. It was the only underwear worn until the end of the Regency era in the 1820s, and was usually the only piece of clothing that was washed regularly.

In the eighteenth century, the primary female undergarment was the chemise or shift: a knee-length, loose-fitting garment of white linen with a straight or slightly triangular silhouette. In the 1810s, the term came also to be applied to an outergarment. In Western countries, the chemise as an undergarment fell out of fashion in the early 20th century, and was generally replaced by a brassiere, girdle, and full slip, and panties first came to be worn.

Men's chemises may be said to have survived as the common T-shirt, which still serves as an undergarment. The chemise also morphed into the smock-frock, a garment worn by English laborers until the early 20th century. Its loose cut and wide sleeves were well adapted to heavy labor. The name smock is nowadays still used for military combat jackets in the UK.

A chemise, shift, or smock was usually sewn at home, by the women of a household. It was assembled from rectangles and triangles cut from one piece of cloth so as to leave no waste. The poor would wear skimpy chemises pieced from a narrow piece of rough cloth; while the rich might have voluminous chemises pieced from thin, smooth fine linen.

Modern chemise

A modern chemise is generally a woman's garment that vaguely resembles the older shirts but is typically more delicate, and usually more revealing. Most commonly the term refers to a loose-fitting, sleeveless undergarment or type of lingerie which is unfitted at the waist. It can also refer to a short, sleeveless dress that hangs straight from the shoulders and fits loosely at the waist. A chemise typically does not have any buttons or other fasteners and is put on by either dropping it over the head or stepping into it and lifting it up.

As lingerie, a chemise is similar to a babydoll, which is also a short, loose-fitting, sleeveless garment. Typically, though, babydolls are looser fitting at the hips.

See also
 Camisole
 Kirtle
 Shalwar kameez
 Slip (clothing)
 Smock (disambiguation)

References

Bibliography
 . A survey of shirt patterns over the ages, with diagrams.

Further reading

External links

Lingerie
History of clothing (Western fashion)
Medieval European costume
Tops (clothing)
French clothing
Women's clothing